Roydon "Roy" Barnett Prosser (18 February 1942 – 13 August 2008) was an Australian Rugby Union player who represented for the Wallabies twenty-five times. Prosser was once Australia's most capped prop.

Early life
Prosser was born in Sydney and attended Newington College (1949–1959) commencing as a preparatory school student in Wyvern House.

Club Rugby
Prosser played a club record 220 first grade games for Northern Suburbs Rugby Club and was a member of our three premiership sides in the 1960s.

Waratahs
He made his New South Wales debut in 1963, making 24 appearances for the Waratahs over the following ten seasons.

Wallabies
Prosser played 25 Test matches: seven against South Africa, six against New Zealand, five against France, three against Ireland and one each against England, Scotland, Wales and Fiji. He made his Test debut in 1967 against England at Twickenham in a game the Wallabies won 23–11 and played in two tests of that 1966–67 Wallaby tour. His last Test was against Fiji in Suva in 1972 which the Wallabies won 21–19.

References

External links
 
 Australian Rugby
 The Courier Mail
 The West Australian

1942 births
2008 deaths
Australian rugby union players
People educated at Newington College
Australia international rugby union players
People from Manly, New South Wales
Rugby union players from Sydney
Rugby union props